Siege of Silves may refer to:

Siege of Silves (1063)
Siege of Silves (1189)
Siege of Silves (1190)
Siege of Silves (1191)